Douglas McKay (2 July 1904 – 9 April 1994) was an Australian cricketer. He played in ten first-class matches for South Australia between 1925 and 1929.

See also
 List of South Australian representative cricketers

References

External links
 

1904 births
1994 deaths
Australian cricketers
South Australia cricketers
Cricketers from Adelaide